Stevenson Township is located in Marion County, Illinois. As of the 2010 census, its population was 1,301 and it contained 516 housing units.

Geography 
Stevenson Township (T2N R3E) is centered at 38°36'N 88°52'W (38.602, -88.864). It is traversed east–west by U.S. Route 50.

Demographics

Adjacent townships 
 Alma Township (north)
 Omega Township (northeast)
 Iuka Township (east)
 Romine Township (southeast)
 Haines Township (south)
 Raccoon Township (southwest)
 Salem Township (west)
 Tonti Township (northwest)

References

External links
US Census
City-data.com
Illinois State Archives

Townships in Marion County, Illinois
Townships in Illinois